Lichminus is a genus of minute marsh-loving beetles in the family Limnichidae. There is one described species in Lichminus, L. tenuicornis.

References

Further reading

 

Byrrhoidea
Articles created by Qbugbot